Ki Hui-hyeon (born June 16, 1995), better known by the mononym Huihyun and former stage name Cathy, is a South Korean singer and rapper. She is best known as a member of the South Korean girl group DIA.

All song credits are adapted from the Korea Music Copyright Association's database, unless otherwise noted.

Solo works

DIA and sub-unit works

Other artists

Other works

References

Ki Hui-hyeon